Manchester United Football Club is an English professional association football club based in Old Trafford, Greater Manchester. The club was formed in Newton Heath in 1878 as Newton Heath LYR F.C., and played their first competitive match in October 1886, when they entered the First Round of the 1886–87 FA Cup. The club was renamed Manchester United F.C. in 1902, and moved to Old Trafford in 1910. Since playing their first competitive match, 955 players have made a competitive first-team appearance for the club, of whom 221 players have made at least 100 appearances (including substitute appearances).

Manchester United's record appearance-maker is Ryan Giggs, who made a total of 963 appearances over a 23-year playing career; he broke Bobby Charlton's previous appearance record in the 2008 UEFA Champions League final. Giggs also holds the record for the most starts, having started in 797 matches. Charlton was also the club's top goalscorer with 249 goals in his 17 years with the club. He held the mark for 45 years, until Charlton's mark was overtaken by Wayne Rooney scoring his 250th goal during the 2016–17 season; Rooney finished his 13-year tenure with Manchester United with 253 goals in 559 appearances. Other than Charlton, Giggs and Rooney, only seven players have made more than 500 appearances for the club, including three members of the 1968 European Cup-winning team (Tony Dunne, Alex Stepney and Bill Foulkes as well as Charlton) and three members of the 1999 Treble-winning team (Denis Irwin, Gary Neville and Paul Scholes as well as Giggs); the seventh is Joe Spence, who played for the club during the interwar period. Other than Charlton and Rooney, only two players (Denis Law and Jack Rowley) have scored more than 200 goals for the club. The most recent player to reach 100 appearances for the club is Bruno Fernandes, who reached the milestone on 2 December 2021.

List of players

 

Appearances and goals are for first-team competitive matches only, including Premier League, Football League, FA Cup, League Cup, Charity/Community Shield, European Cup/Champions League, UEFA Cup/Europa League, Cup Winners' Cup, Inter-Cities Fairs Cup, Super Cup and Club World Cup matches; wartime matches are regarded as unofficial and are excluded, as are matches from the abandoned 1939–40 season.
Players are listed according to the date of their first-team debut for the club.

Statistics correct as of match played 19 March 2023

Table headers
 Nationality – If a player played international football, the country/countries he played for are shown. Otherwise, the player's nationality is given as their country of birth.
 Manchester United career – The year of the player's first appearance for Manchester United to the year of his last appearance.
 Starts – The number of matches started.
 Sub – The number of matches played as a substitute.
 Total – The total number of matches played, both as a starter and as a substitute.

Club captains

Notes

References
General

Specific

 
Players
Manchester United
Association football player non-biographical articles